Phrynocephalus rossikowi, the Uzbekistan toadhead agama, is a species of agamid lizard found in Turkmenistan and Uzbekistan.

References

rossikowi
Reptiles described in 1898
Taxa named by Alexander Nikolsky